Gürpınar is a village and district of Van Province in Turkey. With an area of 4,700 km2, Gürpınar is the largest district of Turkey. It has 79 villages and several places of historical interest. The current mayor is Hayrullah Tanış from the Justice and Development Party (AKP). The current kaymakam Fatih Sayar was appointed in August 2019.

Name 
The area's old Armenian name is Hayots Dzor (meaning "Valley of the Armenians"). Its Kurdish name is Payizava; however, the Armenian-derived Xawesor is also used. The titular village of Gürpınar itself was also known to Armenians as Kghzi (meaning "island", due to it being surrounded by the Shamiram Canal).

History 

In Armenian mythology, Hayots Dzor is the valley where the Armenian progenitor Hayk defeated the army of the invading Babylonian king Bel and constructed a fortress (Haykaberd) nearby.

In the Middle Ages, the area was a part of the Armenian kingdom of Vaspurakan, ruled by the Artsruni dynasty of Armenian kings.

The village of Kghzi had 241 Armenian and 11 Kurdish inhabitants in 1909 (the wider region of Hayots Dzor was home to about 10,000 Armenians before the Armenian genocide). The Armenian population was massacred or displaced during the Armenian genocide; some of the inhabitants managed to flee and settle in Eastern Armenia.

Historical places
Hoşap Castle
Çavuştepe, Urartian castle
Surp Marinos Monastery
Menua Canal

References

External links 
www.gurpinar.gov.tr Gurpinar Government - Gurpinar 
www.van-gurpinar.bel.tr Gurpinar Municipality- Gurpinar 

Cities in Turkey
Populated places in Van Province
Western Armenia
Districts of Van Province
Kurdish settlements in Turkey

cbk-zam:Gürpınar (District), Van
hy:Հայոց Ձոր